Vitaliy Semenovych Shalychev (30 October 1946 – 22 June 2021) was a Soviet football player and a Ukrainian football coach. He was born in Chystyakove.

References

External links
 
 Shalychev stats. Tavria Simferopol website

1946 births
2021 deaths
People from Torez
Soviet footballers
Association football midfielders
Ukrainian football managers
Ukrainian Premier League managers
FC Okean Kerch managers
SC Tavriya Simferopol managers
FC Metalist Kharkiv managers
FC Shakhtar Donetsk players
SC Tavriya Simferopol players
FC Chayka Sevastopol players
FC Dnipro players
Sportspeople from Donetsk Oblast